Raoul Calas (25 March 1899, Thézan-lès-Béziers - 23 December 1978) was a French politician. He represented the French Communist Party in the Constituent Assembly elected in 1945, in the Constituent Assembly elected in 1946 and in the National Assembly from 1946 to 1951 and from 1956 to 1958.

References

1899 births
1978 deaths
People from Hérault
Politicians from Occitania (administrative region)
French Communist Party politicians
Members of the Constituent Assembly of France (1945)
Members of the Constituent Assembly of France (1946)
Deputies of the 1st National Assembly of the French Fourth Republic
Deputies of the 3rd National Assembly of the French Fourth Republic
French military personnel of World War I
French military personnel of World War II
Communist members of the French Resistance